Simon Skinner (died 1417) was an English politician.

Career
Skinner was Member of Parliament for Devizes in 1402, 1407 and May 1413. He was Mayor of Devizes in 1410.

Death
In his will, he asked to be buried in Chew Magna near Bristol. However, he lived in Devizes, Wiltshire. He was survived by his widow, Isabel, and his son, Robert.

References

Year of birth missing
1417 deaths
14th-century births
English MPs 1402
Politicians from Bristol
Mayors of Devizes
English MPs 1407
English MPs May 1413